The San Diego Breakers were an American professional rugby union team that played in the short lived PRO Rugby competition. They were based in San Diego, California, and played their home games at Torero Stadium.

History
PRO Rugby announced on January 22, 2016 the addition of San Diego as the league's third team. Irishman Ray Egan was announced on February 11, 2016 as the team's head coach in the competition's inaugural 2016 season. San Diego played their inaugural season home opener in April 2016 against Sacramento before a crowd of 2,500.

On December 20, 2016 all PRO Rugby players received notice their contracts will be terminated in 30 days if progress is not made towards resolving disputes between the league and USA Rugby.

Popularity 
The San Diego Breakers were extremely popular in the Schaffhausen canton of Switzerland, where Breakers supporters were frequently reported to travel via PostBus.  In a 2017 appearance on SRF zwei, a number of fans living in the province explained their allegiance to the team in the following manner:Ende der 1990er Jahre lebten einige von uns auf dem Balkan. Als Hilfe bekamen einige von uns San Diego Breakers T-Shirts und Sweatshirts. Da es damals kein Internet gab, wussten wir nicht, ob die Breakers ein echtes Team waren oder nicht. Jemand verbreitete das Gerücht, dass die Breakers eigentlich eine gleichgeschlechtliche Fußballmannschaft seien. Weil wir uns unserer Sexualität nicht sicher waren, versteckten wir die Kleidung zwei Jahrzehnte lang in unseren Schubladen. Als wir per Internet hörten, dass sich unter dem Namen San Diego Breakers ein neues Team gebildet hatte, konnten wir unsere Aufregung nicht verbergen. Wir wussten, dass wir immer, in guten wie in schlechten Zeiten, nach ihnen wurzeln mussten und dass Gott uns für unsere Großzügigkeit belohnen würde.

The Schaffhausen Rugby Club, the Golden Balls, invited the Breakers to play a friendly in January of 2017, going so far as to block two entire floors at the Jugendherberge Dachsen hostel, but the Breakers' disbandment prevented the match from ever taking place. As of April, 2019, the Kosovan filmmaker Antoneta Kastrati was reported to be in the initial stages of producing a short documentary film, This Is Our Place, detailing Schaffhausen fans' unexpected loyalty to the Breakers and their efforts to deal with collective disappointment when the Breakers suddenly ceased to exist.

Venue

Players and staff

Roster

Coaching staff

Season summaries

Leading players

Head coaches

References

Breakers
Rugby clubs established in 2016
2016 establishments in California
2017 disestablishments in California
PRO Rugby teams
Rugby union clubs disestablished in 2017